Albert Leonidovich Filozov  (25 June 1937 – 11 April 2016) was a Soviet and Russian actor. He was a People's Artist of Russia.

He was born on June 25, 1937 in Sverdlovsk (now Yekaterinburg). He received the profession of turner, worked at the State Bearing Plant. He graduated from Moscow Art Theater School (1959).

In 1991 before  1995 he was a master (together with Armen Dzhigarkhanyan) acting course at VGIK, he taught at GITIS.

Partial filmography

  (1969) as Otto von Talvig
  (1970)
  (1972)
  (1974) as Kovaliov
  (1975)
  (1976) as Ilya Rozhdestvenskiy
  (1977)
  (1978) as Vinogradov
 Takeoff (1979)  as Panin, apothecary, Konstantin Tsiolkovsky's friend
  (1980)
  (1980) as Fürst
 Could One Imagine? (Вам и не снилось…, 1981) as Konstantin Lavochkin
  (1981) as Tommy Trafford
  (1981)
 Teheran 43 (Тегеран 43, 1981) as Scherner, team leader of Nazi saboteurs
 Lenin in Paris (Ленин в Париже, 1981) as leader of the anarchists
  (1981)
  (Васса, 1983) as Yuri Melnikov, a member of the District Court
 Mary Poppins, Goodbye (Мэри Поппинс. до свиданья!, 1984, TV Movie) as Mr. Banks
  (1986)
  (1986) as Uvarov
  (1986)
  (1987) as Professor
 A Man from the Boulevard des Capucines (Человек с бульвара Капуцинов, 1987) as Mr. Second
 New Adventures of a Yankee in King Arthur's Court (Новые приключения янки при дворе короля Артура, 1988) as King Arthur / Merlin
  (1988)
 The Lady with the parrot (Дама с попугаем, 1988) as Aristarch
  (1989)
  (1990) as Dmitriy Ivanovich's Friend
 The Battle of the Three Kings (Битва трёх королей, 1990) as Hans, the royal librarian
  (1990)
 Lost in Siberia (Затерянный в Сибири, 1991) as Lilka's father
  (1991)
  (1991)
  (1991) as Silin
  (1991)
  (1992)
  (1992)
 Ariel (1992)
  (1993) as The British Father
  (1993)
  (1994)
 ' (1994)
  (1996)
  (1997)
  (1999)
  (2000)
 In August of 1944 (В августе 44-го…, 2001)
  (2002) as Berta's father
  (2002)
 Poor Nastya (Бедная Настя, 2003, TV Series) as Baron Ivan Ivanovich Korf
  (2005)
 The First Circle (В круге первом, 2006, TV Mini-Series) as Uncle Avenir
  (2006)
 Treasure Raiders (Охотники за сокровищами, 2007) as Curator
  (2007) as Maestro
  (2008) as Uncle Averin
  (2008) as White Wizard
  (2009)
  (2010)
  (2010)
 Voin.com'' (2012)
  (2012)
  (Ёлки, 2014) as Vasily Grigoryevich (final film role)

References

External links

 Альберт Филозов в программе Виктора Шендеровича

1937 births
2016 deaths
Actors from Yekaterinburg
Soviet male actors
Russian male actors
People's Artists of Russia
Honored Artists of the RSFSR
Moscow Art Theatre School alumni

Deaths from cancer in Russia
Burials at Vagankovo Cemetery